The Spanish Fork (often referred to as the Spanish Fork River) is a river in southeastern Utah County, Utah, United States.

Description

Formed by the confluence of the Soldier and Thistle creeks in the now ghost town of Thistle (in Spanish Fork Canyon in the Wasatch Range), the river is fairly quickly joined by the Diamond Fork creek.

Located entirely in Utah County (though a small portion of its drainage basin extends into Carbon County), the Spanish Fork is heavily used for irrigation. The Spanish Fork area of Utah Valley has been intensively farmed since Mormons first settled the region in the 1860s, but as the amount of agricultural land grew the river was no longer able to provide sufficient water except in years of heavy runoff. In 1909, the U.S. Bureau of Reclamation completed a tunnel to supplement the Spanish Fork's flow using water from the Strawberry River through the Strawberry Valley Project, part of the Central Utah Project. This diverted water is received via Spanish Fork's main tributary, the Diamond Fork.

Spanish Fork River Trail
A , asphalt-paved parkway trail, for pedestrians and non-motorized vehicles, has been completed along the Spanish Fork. It begins near the mouth of Spanish Fork Canyon and runs roughly along the north bank of the river to a point near the western border of the city of Spanish Fork (just before the river passes under Utah State Route 115 and Interstate 15. The trail connects with the several other similar trails in the city of Spanish Fork and the river bottoms (the area south of Spanish Fork and the East Bench). One of these trails is the short  Dripping Rock trail, which follows the river south from The Oaks at Spanish Fork golf course.

Thistle landslide dam

However, due to the instability of the landslide, this was not possible.

The reservoir lasted for five months before a bypass project was completed to drain the water through a tunnel. The tunnel runs through the solid bedrock of the canyon wall north of the landslide and the former course of the river. (Initially another tunnel, completed at a higher elevation, served as a spillway for the dam. Though no longer used, this spillway tunnel still exists.) Since the original watercourse is irrecoverable, the Spanish Fork still flows through the (lower, main) bypass tunnel. The landslide resulted in the first presidential (federal) disaster area declaration for the state of Utah. It is also considered one of the most costly landslides to ever to have occurred in the United States.

See also

 List of rivers of Utah

References

External links

Rivers of Utah
Tributaries of Utah Lake
Rivers of Utah County, Utah